Blepharomastix monocamptalis is a moth in the family Crambidae. It was described by George Hampson in 1918. It is found in Colombia.

Description
The moth's wingspan is 24–28 mm. The forewings are silvery white and are faintly tinged with pale red-brown and a pale red-brown costal area, but leaving the costal edge white on the medial area. The antemedial line is red-brown and there is a red-brown discoidal bar, as well as a red-brown postmedial line and a rather diffused red-brown terminal line. The hindwings are white, faintly tinged with pale red-brown and with a red-brown discoidal bar. The postmedial line is red-brown and there is a pale red-brown subterminal shade, as well as a fine red-brown terminal line.

References

Moths described in 1918
Blepharomastix